Jefferson da Silva Nascimento (born June 29, 1986) known as Jeff Silva, is a Brazilian football defender who plays for Boavista.

Career
Born in Campo Mourão, he begin playing in the youth team of Londrina Esporte Clube where he became senior in 2006. In 2007, he had a spell in Portugal with S.C. Beira-Mar. In December 2007 Avaí Futebol Clube signed him from Londrina and he was part of the team that won promotion to the Campeonato Brasileiro Série A. However, he did not stay and moved abroad to play with Red Star Belgrade in the Serbian SuperLiga. In the winter break of the 2009–10 he was released, and while returning to Brazil, he was picked right in the airport by Atlético Monte Azul to sign him and helped them win the Campeonato Paulista A2. After only 6 months he was signed in July 2010 by Fortaleza Esporte Clube, however his spell with them in the Campeonato Brasileiro Série C there was also short, as by the end of the year he was signing with Clube Náutico Capibaribe.+
On December 12, 2012 he moved to ABC FC, Brasil Serie B.

Honours
Monte Azul
Campeonato Paulista Série A2: 2009

Fortaleza
Campeonato Cearense: 2010

References

External sources
 
 Jeff Silva at Srbijafudbal

Living people
1986 births
Brazilian footballers
Association football defenders
Serbian SuperLiga players
Brazilian expatriate footballers
Expatriate footballers in Portugal
Expatriate footballers in Serbia
Expatriate footballers in Hungary
Brazilian expatriate sportspeople in Portugal
Brazilian expatriate sportspeople in Serbia
Brazilian expatriate sportspeople in Hungary
Londrina Esporte Clube players
S.C. Beira-Mar players
Avaí FC players
Red Star Belgrade footballers
Atlético Monte Azul players
Fortaleza Esporte Clube players
Clube Náutico Capibaribe players
Fehérvár FC players
Diósgyőri VTK players
ABC Futebol Clube players
Paulista Futebol Clube players
Ceilândia Esporte Clube players
Boavista Sport Club players
Esporte Clube Novo Hamburgo players